Munira Yamin Satti (died 7 January 2021) was a Pakistani politician who had been a member of the Provincial Assembly of the Punjab from 15 August 2018 to 7 January 2021.

Political career
She was elected to the Provincial Assembly of the Punjab as a candidate of Pakistan Muslim League (N) (PML-N) on a reserved seat for women in 2018 Pakistani general election.

Death
She died on 7 January 2021, due to COVID-19, during the COVID-19 pandemic in Pakistan.

References

Punjabi people
Pakistan Muslim League (N) MPAs (Punjab)
Year of birth missing
2021 deaths
Deaths from the COVID-19 pandemic in Punjab, Pakistan